Both stages of the women's 25 metre pistol competition at the 2000 Summer Olympics were held on 22 September, and the final was fired at 14:00 Australian Eastern Standard Time (UTC+10). After having lost only one point in the precision stage, Tao Luna set a new Olympic record of 590 points in the qualification round, but lost the final to Mariya Grozdeva, who won on a new Olympic final record of 690.3.

Records
Prior to this competition, the existing World and Olympic records were as follows.

Qualification round

OR Olympic record – Q Qualified for final

Final
The final consisted of ten precision shots, with a time limit of 75 seconds per shot.

OR Olympic record

References

Sources

Shooting at the 2000 Summer Olympics
Olymp
Women's events at the 2000 Summer Olympics